Yana Stanislavovna "Yanka" Dyagileva (4 September 1966 –  1991) was a Russian poet and singer-songwriter and one of the most popular figures of her time in Russia's underground punk scene. She both played solo and performed with others, including Yegor Letov and bands Grazhdanskaya Oborona and  Velikiye Oktyabri ("Great Octobers"). Dyagileva was greatly influenced by Letov and Alexander Bashlachev, who were her friends. Her songs explored themes of desperation and depression, punk-style nihilism, and folk-like lamentations. Her death in 1991 has been considered as a symbolic end to the Siberian punk scene.

Biography 
Yanka (born Yana) Dyagileva was born on 4 September 1966, in Novosibirsk, USSR to Stanislav Dyagilev and Galina Dyagileva, both engineers. She was of Russian, Ukrainian and Czech origin.  In 1973 she attended public school and studied piano for a year at a music school before quitting. This sparked her interest in the guitar. While still in school Yanka started writing poems (which have been lost) and performing, singing and playing guitar in school talent shows. In 1984 she entered the Novosibirsk Institute of Water Transport Engineers, but dropped out in her sophomore year. During this period she performed with the political band AMIGO. The earliest of Dyagileva's poetry that has survived is from 1985. In December 1985 she traveled to Leningrad, where she may have met Alexander Bashlachev. In October 1986, Dyagileva's mother died of cancer.

In April 1987, Yanka met Egor Letov and joined his band Grazhdanskaya Oborona (Gr.Ob.). From 1988 to 1990, Dyagileva toured and performed with the band. She recorded her first album Not Allowed in January 1988. Her first performance before a large audience took place on 24 June 1988, at a punk festival in Tyumen, recorded in the bootleg album To the Drop-Outs. In 1989, Dyagileva performed in Leningrad for the first time as part of a concert produced by Sergei Firsov, who became Dyagileva and Gr.Ob.'s first producer. Dyagileva's album Sold! was recorded in Firsov's apartment. Dyagileva's final known public appearances took place in November 1990 in Irkutsk, Angarsk, and Leningrad. Her final live concert recording took place in Irkutsk on 10 November 1990. Several more performances were planned for February 1991 in Irkutsk; it is unknown if they ever took place. At the end of February 1991, Dyagileva recorded her last songs in a Novosibirsk Electro-Technical Institute dormitory: "Legs [Feet] Above the Ground", "Five-Kopeck Coin in the Road", "About Little Devils", and "Water Will Come".

9 May 1991 is accepted as her official date of death. That evening she left her family's countryside home outside Novosibirsk and did not return. Her body was found by a fisherman on 17 May in the Inya River. She was presumed to have drowned near Novorodnikovo Train Station and been carried 40 kilometers by the current. On 19 May, she was buried in Novosibirsk's Zayeltsovskoye Cemetery. The exact time, place, and conditions surrounding Dyagileva's death remain unknown.

Discography 
 1988 - Ne polozheno (Not Allowed)
 1988 - Deklassirovannim elementam (To the Fringe Elements)
 1988 - Live in Kurgan
 1989 - Prodano! (Sold!)
 1989 - Krasnogvardeyskaya (Live in Moscow) - Named after the Moscow Metro station. A.k.a. "Akustika".
 1989 - Live in Kharkiv (Ukraine)
 1989 - Domoi! (Going home!)
 1989 - Angedonia ("Anhedonia")
 1990 - Yanka & Grazhdanskaya Oborona live in MEI
 1991 - Styd i Sram (Shame and Reproach) - There are two variants of this album, one containing four acoustic songs. The other is a compilation with remastering done by Letov; the compilation contains seven songs, mostly electrified (not acoustic).
 2009 - Angedonia (remastered)  ("Anhedonia")

See also
Alina Simone

References

External links 
 
Tribute web site (in Russian)
 Yanka, Messenger of Russian Anguish (Biography)

1966 births
1991 deaths
Date of death unknown
Women punk rock singers
Musicians from Novosibirsk
Soviet women singers
Russian rock singers
Russian people of Czech descent
Russian people of Ukrainian descent
Deaths by drowning
20th-century Russian women singers
20th-century Russian singers
Burials at Zayeltsovskoye Cemetery